Esco Haynes was a Negro league catcher in the 1920s.

Haynes made his Negro leagues debut in 1921 with the Pittsburgh Keystones. He went on to play for several teams, finishing his career in 1924 with the Cleveland Browns.

References

External links
 and Baseball-Reference Black Baseball stats and Seamheads

Place of birth missing
Place of death missing
Year of birth missing
Year of death missing
Cleveland Browns (baseball) players
Homestead Grays players
Milwaukee Bears players
Pittsburgh Keystones players
Toledo Tigers players
Baseball catchers